Sandwort is the common name of several flowering plants in the carnation family, which may be members of the following genera:

Arenaria
Minuartia
Moehringia

See also
 Wort plants